Mendozasaurus is a genus of titanosaurian sauropod dinosaur. It was a member of Titanosauria, which were massive sauropods that were common on the southern landmasses during the Cretaceous. It is represented by several partial skeletons from a single locality within the Coniacian (lower Upper Cretaceous) Sierra Barrosa Formation in the south of Mendoza Province, northern Neuquén Basin, Argentina.
The type species, Mendozasaurus neguyelap, was described by Argentine paleontologist Bernardo Javier González Riga in 2003. Mendozasaurus is the first dinosaur named from Mendoza Province, Argentina, for which it was named.

Description 

This species belonged to the discovered clade Lognkosauria, a transitional group of titanosaurs which included the gigantic Futalognkosaurus and Puertasaurus. Like both of these animals, Mendozasaurus had a long neck with very wide cervical neural spines. In 2010 Gregory S. Paul estimated Mendozasaurus at 20 meters (65.6 feet) in length and 16 tonnes (17.6 short tons) in weight.

Classification 
A phylogenetic analysis conducted by González Riga and colleagues in 2018 recovered Mendozasaurus as the most basal member of Lognkosauria, including Futalognkosaurus and the gigantic titanosaurs Argentinosaurus, Notocolossus, Patagotitan and Puertasaurus.

The following cladogram shows the position of Mendozasaurus in Lognkosauria according to González Riga and colleagues, 2018.

References

Further reading 
 González Riga, B.J. (2003). "A new titanosaur (Dinosauria, Sauropoda) from the Upper Cretaceous of Mendoza, Argentina". Amehginiana 40: 155–172.
 González Riga, B.J. (2005). "Nuevos restos fósiles de Mendozasaurus neguyelap (Sauropoda: Titanosauridae) del Cretácico Tardío de Mendoza, Argentina". Ameghiniana 42 (3): 535–538.
 González Riga, B.J. and Astini, R. (2007). "Fossil preservation of large titanosaur sauropods in overbank fluvial facies: a case study in the Cretaceous of Argentina". Journal of South American Earth Sciences 23: 290–303.

External links 
 Sauropod dinosaurs: Complementary information on South American titanosaurs

Lithostrotians
Coniacian life
Late Cretaceous dinosaurs of South America
Cretaceous Argentina
Fossils of Argentina
Neuquén Basin
Fossil taxa described in 2003